The Cloud may refer to:

 The Cloud (company), a UK wireless network operator
 Cloud storage, Internet-available storage
Cloud computing, resources via the Internet
 The Cloud (hill), a hill in England
 The Cloud, a novel by Ray Hammond
 The Cloud (painting), 1985, by Odd Nerdrum
 "The Cloud" (poem), 1820, by Shelley
 The Cloud, Auckland, a sports venue, New Zealand
 "The Cloud" (Star Trek: Voyager), sixth episode
 The Cloud (film), Germany, 2006

See also
 Cloud (disambiguation)
 Cloud storage